Protriacanthus is an extinct genus of ray-finned fish. It contains a single species, P. gortanii.

Sources

The Paleobiology Database

Prehistoric ray-finned fish genera
Tetraodontiformes